Kiærskou is a Danish surname. Notable people with the surname include: 

Frederik Christian Kiærskou (1805–1891), Danish landscape painter
Hjalmar Kiærskou (1835–1900), Danish botanist
Lotte Kiærskou (born 1975), Danish team handball player

Danish-language surnames